Lorraine Seratti (born October 30, 1949) is an American Republican politician from Wisconsin.

Born in L'Anse, Michigan, Seratti was a businesswoman in Spread Eagle, Wisconsin. Seratti served in the Wisconsin State Assembly 1993 until 2005, when she announced her retirement from the Wisconsin State Assembly in 2004.

Notes

People from L'Anse, Michigan
People from Florence, Wisconsin
Women state legislators in Wisconsin
Members of the Wisconsin State Assembly
1949 births
Living people
21st-century American politicians
21st-century American women politicians